This is a comprehensive list of victories of the  cycling team.

Seasons

2009

2010

2011

2012

2013

2014

2015

2016

2017

Classics

Grand Tours

Stage wins

Classifications

Team classification

Footnotes

References

Katusha
wins